HMS Whimbrel is the last surviving Royal Navy warship present at the Japanese Surrender in World War II.

Second World War Service

Launched on 25 August 1942 almost nine months after laying down which was about average for this class of vessel. She was commissioned on 13 January 1943 and was to primarily serve in the Atlantic as part of several escort groups. In 1945 she was sent to the Pacific for the last few months in war being part of the large exodus of ships there. She was present at the Japanese surrender.

Post war

In November 1949 she was sold to Egypt and renamed El Malek Farouq. In 1954 she was renamed Tariq.

A preservation attempt launched in 2006 aimed to bring her to Canning Dock Liverpool as a memorial to those who died on the Atlantic Convoys.  On 26 March 2008 a plaque celebrating the ship was presented to the Mayor of Sefton.  John Livingston, president of the Liverpool branch of the Whimbrel Project, said: "She’d be a marvellous addition to our waterfront and a reminder of the sacrifice of our seamen".  The Mayor of Sefton, Cllr Richard Hands, said: "HMS Whimbrel forms a unique part of both our social and maritime history and I fully support the campaign to bring her back to Liverpool". The attempt stalled when it was not possible to agree a price with the Egyptian Government. Then, in 2016, it was reported in Parliament that the Egyptian Navy had offered her for sale to the National Museum of the Royal Navy, Portsmouth for £725,000, and that the museum had shown an interest in housing HMS Whimbrel and is investigating the possibility of bringing it back to the UK.

She currently is laid up at Alexandria as a training ship.

Notes

Publications

External links
 HMS Whimbrel in Liverpool, 2003
 navynews article
 Battle of the Atlantic Memorial Project

Sloops of the Royal Navy
1942 ships
Ships built on the River Clyde